Dayton Christian High School is a private, non-denominational Christian high school located in Miamisburg, Ohio, United States, educating approximately 900 students. Dayton Christian integrates Biblical instruction into its curriculum.

Dayton Christian's mission is "Educating for Eternity." The school's founder, Rev. Claude (Bud) E. Schindler, Jr., was formerly an NCR sales executive. As of 2017, Dr. John Gredy is the school system's Head of School. In 2004 the school moved from the historic Julienne school building on Homewood Avenue near downtown Dayton to the former NCR World Training Center near Miamisburg.

Sports

Swimming
The Dayton Christian High School swim team won All-Conference in the Metro Buckeye Conference for two consecutive seasons: 2018-2019 and 2019–2020.

Ohio High School Athletic Association State Championships

 Boys Cross Country – 1984
 Boys Track and Field - 1982, 1996, 2007
 Boys Wrestling - 2015

Notable alumni
Romain Sato '00, professional basketball player
Luke Grimes '02, actor (True Blood, Fifty Shades of Grey, Yellowstone)

See also
 Civil Rights Commission v. Dayton Christian Schools

References

External links
 

High schools in Montgomery County, Ohio
Private high schools in Ohio
Miamisburg, Ohio